Marlain Guy Veal (born April 21, 1996) is an American professional basketball player for the Sichuan Blue Whales in the Chinese Basketball Association (CBA). He plays the point guard position.

Early life
Veal was born in Gretna, Louisiana, to Patrick Roublow and Swylita Veal. He has five brothers and sisters. He is 5-9 (175 cm tall), and weighs 145 pounds (66 kg). He said: "A lot of schools said I was too small.... That's why I play with a chip on my shoulder."

He attended Helen Cox High School, and graduated in 2015. Veal had transferred to Cox from McDonogh 35 before his sophomore season. Playing for Cox basketball, Veal averaged 15.3 points, 4.0 rebounds, 4.0 assists, and 2.0 steals per game in his senior year. He was Louisiana Sports Writers Association’s (LSWA) 5A Player of the Year, NOLA.com/The Times-Picayune Large Schools Player of the Year, District 8-5A MVP. All-State, All-District, and The New Orleans Advocate All-Metro.

College career
Veal attended Southeastern Louisiana University, majoring in communications. He had a successful career; 3 selections to the All-Southland conference (2 First-Team), 2 Southland Defensive Player of the Year awards, and 2 All-Defensive team selections.

Professional career
Veal played for Final Spor Gençlik in the Turkish TBL in 2019-20, averaging 23.1 points, 7.3 assists, and 2.0 steals per game.

For the 2020-21 season, Veal played for Bnei Herzliya in the Israeli Basketball Premier League.

For the 2022-23 season, Veal is playing for Sichuan Blue Whales in the Chinese Basketball Association.

References 

1996 births
Living people
American expatriate basketball people in Turkey
American expatriate basketball people in Israel
American men's basketball players
Basketball players from Louisiana
Israeli Basketball Premier League players
Point guards
People from Gretna, Louisiana
Southeastern Louisiana Lions basketball players